Deportivo Pomalca is a Peruvian football club, playing in the city of Chiclayo, Lambayeque, Peru.

Rivalries
Deportivo Pomalca has had a long-standing rivalry with José Pardo.

Honours

Regional
Región I:
Winners (1): 1999
 Runner-up (3): 1998, 2000, 2001 

Liga Departamental de Lambayeque:
Winners (6): 1998, 1999, 2000, 2001, 2008, 2012
 Runner-up (2): 2010, 2011

Liga Superior de Lambayeque:
Winners (2): 2009, 2010
 Runner-up (1): 2007

Liga Distrital de Chiclayo:
Winners (7):  1982, 1984, 1995, 1998, 1999, 2001, 2002

See also
List of football clubs in Peru
Peruvian football league system

External links
 Huerequeque Puro

Football clubs in Peru
Association football clubs established in 1949